The Twentieth Anniversary Joint Declaration: Challenges to Freedom of Expression in the next decade, which was published in 2019, is one of many Joint Declarations of the representatives of intergovernmental bodies to protect free media and expression. Jointly annually, the United Nations (UN), the Organization for Security and Co-operation in Europe (OSCE), the Organization of American States (OAS) and the African Commission on Human and Peoples’ Rights (ACHPR) publish a Declaration on the results of their discussions about the topic on hand. During these discussions each Organization acts as a Representative or Rapporteur on a specific human right. The most recent one took happened as the following:

The United Nations (UN) acted as the Special Rapporteur on Freedom of Opinion and Expression, the Organization for Security and Co-operation in Europe (OSCE) acted as the Representative on Freedom of the Media, the Organization of American States (OAS) acted as the Special Rapporteur on Freedom of Expression and the African Commission on Human and Peoples’ Rights (ACHPR) acted as the Special Rapporteur on Freedom of Expression and Access to Information. Their aim is to provide guidance to governments, civil society organisations, legal professionals, journalists and media outlets, academics and the business sector.

Protocol 
The first part of the declaration consists of a protocol of several achievements, apprehensions, and aspirations the representatives wished to point out. For instance, they believe that the past 20 declarations published so far contributed to the establishment of authoritative standards which address a wide range of issues and challenges. They also address the importance of freedom of expression to democracy, sustainable development, the protection of all other rights, and efforts to counter terrorism, propaganda and incitement to violence.

All parties have also expressed concern about the increasing violence against many reporters, activists and journalists that are exercising their right to freedom of expression and are in several parts of the world being prosecuted for doing so.

Whilst there have been significant contributions from new digital technologies that made expanding global communication easier, enabled the possibility for people everywhere to access information and ideas and to express themselves, the representatives also acknowledge there's still room to improve. Not everyone has access to the internet, disinformation and propaganda still gets spread fast, additionally to arbitrary and unlawful surveillance being enabled.

Therefore, the representatives express their concern about the deepening threats to media diversity and independence they have observed, which also includes an increased concentration of media ownership and political control and censorship over public media services.

Most importantly, the representatives stress, that all States need to respect the obligations previously set in Article 19 of the International Covenant on Civil and Political Rights, especially by ensuring that any restriction they make is necessary and appropriate, and by enabling an independent judicial oversight over the application of any taken restrictions. They also remark, that these same obligations should be mandatory for private companies, who should have the same standards in regards to respecting human rights.

Joint Declaration challenges to be adopted in the next decade

Creating an Environment that Enables the Exercise of Freedom of Expression 
The creators of the Join Declaration state at the document that in order to achieve freedom of expression, certain things have to be given. For example, states should guarantee taking immediate action to protect the safety of journalists and other victims who are attacked for exercising their right to freedom of expression, and to end impunity for such attacks. Other examples address that the state should provide media diversity and a voice to marginalised groups. In addition, the state should explore more seriously the major economic challenges faced by independent journalists and media outlets, including by supporting local media and regulation to mitigate the negative impacts caused by the dominance of online advertising companies. To check further demands from the Declaration, please review the sources of this article.

Building and Maintaining a Free, Open and Inclusive Internet 
To be able to engage in freedom of expression it requires a digital infrastructure that allows all stakeholders to participate equally. Some examples in the Joint Declaration are on the one hand, that the State should expand initiatives to provide universal and affordable internet access and recognise the internet use as a human right, so that everyone could take part in the discourse online. On the other hand, the State should respect and reinforce the principle of network neutrality and avoid measures that risk fragmenting the Internet.

Private Control as a Threat to Freedom of Expression 
The declaration also urges for development, especially because some companies hold too much power over their users and their online activities. Some of the suggested development is to have more oversight, transparency and accountability mechanisms to address private content rules. Mainly the rules that may be inconsistent with international human rights and interfere with individuals’ rights of freedom of expression. Another suggested development would be to have human rights sensitive solutions for disinformation online and to have effective rules and systems that prevent concentration of ownership and practices which represent an abuse of a dominant market position. For further suggestions on this category of the Declaration, please review the sources of this article.

Independent Opinions 
"The importance and relevance of these joint declarations have been highlighted by their use in international court decisions relating to freedom of expression." - David Kaye,  Former Special Rapporteur on the promotion and protection of the right to freedom of opinion and expression. “The fact that Joint Declarations have been issued continuously for 20 years is itself a tremendous achievement. This Declaration is special inasmuch as it provides a framework to guide monitoring of future threats to freedom of expression.” - Toby Mendel, executive director of the Center for Law and Democracy (CLD). It is worth noting, that the CLD assisted the drafting of the declaration, therefore this opinion might be slightly influenced.

Freedom of Expression and public opinion 
Article 10 of the Human Rights Act states that freedom of expression is a human right; this right shall include freedom to hold opinions, to receive and impart information and ideas without interference of public authority. The freedoms of speech and expression are stated to not absolute, however, as not all expression is protected or equally protected. Article 10 states that to protect the health of the state and the health of others, the government can go against the right of freedom of expression if it is justified in the eyes of the society. Often states have the tendency to overdetermine the content of freedom of expression or to underdetermine the content of the same liberty in the United States. This reflects if concrete sociopolitical needs are still relevant to address contemporary concerns in the understanding of the limits of rights in the digital age humanity is in now. The States have to find a solution to finding criteria that balance between expressive freedoms and other values when they are in conflict.

Freedom of Expression and the Internet 
The Commission notes that some governments have taken measures to unduly restrict freedom of expression, and on 1 June 2011, the following declaration on freedom of expression was drawn up:

General Principles:
The right to freedom of expression applies both to the Internet and to all other media. Restrictions are only accepted if they comply with recognised international standards. Awareness-raising and education activities for responsible use of the Internet by individuals will also be promoted.

Liability of Intermediaries:
Intermediaries providing technical Internet services or the search or transmission of information should not be liable for the content generated by others unless there is an order to do so.

Filtering and Blocking:
Obligatory blocking of an entire website or IP address is a very strong measure and only justified if international standards prove it, for example for the protection of children.

Criminal and Civil Liability:
Jurisdiction in disputes relating to Internet content should be limited to the countries with which the cases are actually and factually related, usually because the author was resident there and the content Upload there and/or the content is specific to that country. Individuals may only refer cases to certain courts.

Network Neutrality:
In the handling of Internet data and traffic there should be no discrimination based on device, content, author, service or application.

Access to the Internet:
Universal access to the Internet should be promoted, as it promotes the realisation of the right to freedom of expression, but also other rights such as the right to education and health care. There is no justification whatsoever for banning Internet access for whole sections of the population. Universal Internet access for states is therefore mandatory. In this respect, States should establish regulatory mechanisms, which may include, for example, price regulations or licensing agreements. States should also promote awareness of the use of the Internet and its benefits, especially among the poor, children and older people and remote rural populations. Inclusion is also important. Support should therefore be given to the introduction of specific measures to ensure equal access to the Internet for disabled and disadvantaged persons.

References 

2019 documents
Freedom of expression